The  is a river in Iwate Prefecture, Japan. It flows through the city of Morioka, where it enters the Kitakami River.

Rivers of Iwate Prefecture
Morioka, Iwate
Rivers of Japan